Sea Dragon or seadragon may refer to:

Animals
 Leafy seadragon (Phycodurus eques)
 Phyllopteryx genus
 Common seadragon or weedy seadragon (Phyllopteryx taeniolatus)
 Ruby seadragon (Phyllopteryx dewysea)
 Glaucus atlanticus, a sea slug

Military
 Operation Sea Dragon (Vietnam War), a military operation
 MH-53E Sea Dragon, a helicopter
 USS Seadragon, two ships of the US Navy
 Kairyū-class submarine ("Sea Dragon"), a class of Japanese submarines
 Blohm & Voss BV 138B, "Seedrache (Sea Dragon)", Luftwaffe's main long-range maritime reconnaissance flying boat
 Sea Dragon, China's People's Liberation Navy commando force

Other uses
 Sea Dragon (rocket), a 1960's proposed American super heavy lift two stage sea launched rocket
 Sea Dragon (roller coaster)
 Sea Dragon-class ROV, a remotely operated underwater vehicle developed by China
 Sea Dragon (video game), is a horizontally scrolling shooter for the TRS-80 computer, written by Wayne Westmoreland and Terry Gilman, and released in 1982 by Adventure International
 Sea serpent, a mythical sea creature
 Seadragon, a zooming technology by Seadragon Software
 Sea Dragon, a fictional creature in the Majipoor novel series
 Sea Dragon Leviathan, an organism in Subnautica
 Ichthyosaur
 Francisco José do Nascimento (1839-1914), Brazilian maritime pilot and abolitionist known as "Dragão do Mar" (Sea Dragon)

See also
 Sea Monsters (disambiguation)
 Dragonfish (disambiguation)
 The Dragon in the Sea, a novel by Frank Herbert